The Gustav Vietor Tower was one of the earliest steel lattice observation towers to be built in Germany. Constructed of stone and steel in 1882–3 on the Hohe Wurzel mountain near Wiesbaden in Hesse, the 23-metre-tall tower was demolished in 2006, having been closed to visitors 20 years earlier, although it remained in use by radio amateurs.

Location
The tower was situated on the territory of the town of Taunusstein, which is part of the Kreis (district) of Rheingau-Taunus in the Regierungsbezirk (administrative region) of Darmstadt in Hesse, central west Germany.

See also
Gillerberg Observation Tower
Gross Reken Melchenberg Radio Tower
Schomberg Observation Tower
Utbremen Radio Tower

References

External links
SkyscraperPage Forum

Towers completed in 1882
Observation towers in Hesse
Buildings and structures demolished in 2006
Buildings and structures in Rheingau-Taunus-Kreis